The Billabong Sanctuary is an  wildlife sanctuary in Nome,  south of Townsville, North Queensland, Australia.

Animals

The sanctuary is a permanent home to over 100 species of Australian mammals and reptiles such as kangaroos, wallabies, koalas, wombats, crocodiles, and  birds including parrots and cassowaries. In addition, the natural billabong (lake) at the center of the sanctuary is host to many visiting animals, some of which will breed and raise their young at the sanctuary. Visitors to the sanctuary can take guided or self-guided tours through the  natural tropical bush.

Breeding programs

Breeding programs at the sanctuary include the southern cassowary, estuarine crocodile, northern bettong, common wombat, koala, nail-tail wallaby, eclectus parrot, black-headed python, and from September 2016 Greater Bilby.

Awards

The Billabong Sanctuary has won several awards, including the North Queensland Tourism Awards for Eco-tourism (2002 & 2006) and the Townsville City Council Environmental Excellence Award (1999).

References

External links

1985 establishments in Australia
Zoos established in 1985
Townsville
Tourist attractions in Queensland
Zoos in Queensland
Wildlife parks in Australia
Wildlife sanctuaries of Australia